The following lists events that happened during 2008 in the Republic of Zimbabwe.

Incumbents
 President: Robert Mugabe 
 Prime Minister: Morgan Tsvangirai 
 First Vice President: Joice Mujuru
 Second Vice President: Joseph Msika

Events

January
 January 23 - Police in Zimbabwe arrest Morgan Tsvangirai, the leader of the Movement for Democratic Change, the principal opposition party.
 January 26 - Police in Zimbabwe arrest Nicholas van Hoogstraten for allegedly violating the Exchange Control Regulations Act by asking his tenants to pay in foreign currency. He is also accused of violating the Censorship Act for possessing pornography. Police seize Z$20 billion ($0.6m).
 January 28 - Inflation in Zimbabwe rises to about 150,000%. The Zimbabwean dollar is essentially worthless.

March
 March 29 - Zimbabweans vote in the presidential and parliamentary elections.
 March 30 - Delays in releasing the official results of parliamentary and presidential elections in Zimbabwe are met with widespread speculation and concerns over possible vote rigging.
 March 31 - The Zimbabwe Electoral Commission starts releasing results of the Zimbabwean parliamentary election, 2008 and Zimbabwean presidential election, 2008 with the Opposition Movement for Democratic Change claiming victory on the basis of unofficial results.

April
 April 2 - Morgan Tsvangirai's Movement for Democratic Change defeats Robert Mugabe's ZANU-PF in the Zimbabwean parliamentary elections.

References

 
2000s in Zimbabwe
Years of the 21st century in Zimbabwe
Zimbabwe
Zimbabwe